Bhaban , Bhavan or Bhawan (Bengali: ভবন/ Devanagari: भवन) is the South Asian term for a building similar to a château, palace, or manor house.

Parliament House
Jatiya Sangsad Bhaban, the house of the Parliament of Bangladesh.
Sansad Bhavan,  the house of the Parliament of India.

Official residence
Rashtrapati Bhavan,  official residence of the President of India.
Banga Bhaban, the official residence of the President of Bangladesh.
Gana Bhaban, the official residence of the Prime Minister of Bangladesh.
Uttara Gana Bhaban, principal residence of the Bangladeshi Prime Minister in the northern part of the country.
Rastrapati Bhawan, the official Residence of the President of Nepal.
Raj Bhavan (disambiguation), the common name of the official residences of the State Governors in India.

Historic house museum
Teen Murti Bhavan
Swaraj Bhavan
Anand Bhavan
Netaji Bhawan

Nepali royal palace
Harihar Bhawan
Bahadur Bhawan
Kailashkut Bhawan

Others
Dhaka Nagar Bhaban
Bangladesh Shilpa Bank Bhaban
Janata Bank Bhaban
RAJUK Bhaban
BRAC Bhaban
Saravana Bhavan
Rajiv Gandhi Bhawan
Geeta Bhawan

See also